14 Corps, 14th Corps, Fourteenth Corps, or XIV Corps may refer to:

 XIV Corps (Grande Armée), a unit of the Imperial French Army during the Napoleonic Wars
 XIV Corps (German Empire), a unit of the Imperial German Army prior to and during World War I
 XIV Reserve Corps (German Empire), a unit of the Imperial German Army during World War I
 XIV Corps (India)
 XIV Corps (Ottoman Empire)
 14th Army Corps (Russian Empire), a unit of the Imperial Russian Army between 1877 and 1918
 14th Army Corps (Russian Federation), a unit of the Russian Ground Forces since 2016
 XIV Corps (United Kingdom)
 XIV Corps (United States)
 XIV Corps (Union Army), a unit in the American Civil War

See also
 List of military corps by number